Insecure direct object reference (IDOR) is a type of access control vulnerability in digital security.

This can occur when a web application or application programming interface uses an identifier for direct access to an object in an internal database but does not check for access control or authentication. For example, if the request URL sent to a web site directly uses an easily enumerated unique identifier (such as http://foo.com/doc/1234), that can provide an exploit for unintended access to all records.

A directory traversal attack is considered a special case of a IDOR.

The vulnerability is of such significant concern that for many years it was listed as one of the Open Web Application Security Project’s (OWASP) Top 10 vulnerabilities.

Examples 
In November 2020, the firm Silent Breach identified an IDOR vulnerability with the United States Department of Defense web site and privately reported it via the DOD's Vulnerability Disclosure Program. The bug was fixed by adding a user session mechanism to the account system, which would require authenticating on the site first.

It was reported that the Parler social networking service used sequential post IDs, and that this had enabled the scraping of terabytes of data from the service in January 2021. The researcher responsible for the project has said this was inaccurate.

References 

Web security exploits
Hacking (computer security)